Wockenfuss is a German surname. Notable people with the surname include:

 John Wockenfuss (born 1949), American professional baseball player and manager
 Klaus Wockenfuss (born 1951), German chess master

German-language surnames